Broderick was launched at Shields in 1786. Between 1786 and 1793 she made seven annual voyages as a whaler in the northern whale fishery (Greenland and Davis Strait). Broderick was last listed in 1866.

Career
The following data is primarily from Coltish:

In 1788 Broderick was in the Davis Strait. Lloyd's List reported on 18 July 1788 that Broderick, Crastor, master, had returned to Shields having caught five "fish" (whales). A year later she returned from the Davis's  with seven large "fish".

On 4 November 1788, Broderick, arrived at Portsmouth from Gibraltar.

On 5 August 1791, Broderick, arrived at Shields, Cloughton, master, from Davis Strait, having taken four 'fish'.

Broderick first appeared in Lloyd's Register (LR) in 1799.

On 23 January 1806, Broderick ran afoul of Jenny's Adventure, of Sunderland, off the Yorkshire coast, sinking her immediately. Three crew from Jenny's Adventure were killed.
 
Lloyd's List reported on 15 June 1824 that the crew of Hyperion, of Shields, had abandoned her in the Atlantic Ocean. Broderick, whilst bound for Quebec, under the command of R. Peart, master and owner, rescued the crew.

In 1834, Broderick, R. Peart, master and owner, sustained damages requiring repairs. At the time she was trading between Newcastle and the Baltic.

In 1845 Broderick was sailing between Shields and the Baltic and then Shields and America. Her master was W. Carr, and her owner R. Peart. She had undergone small repairs in 1839 and a large repair in 1842.

Fate
Broderick was last listed in 1866 with T. Hopper, master, and S. Hewson, owner, and with trade London—Shields. That information had not changed since at least 1860 and may have been stale-dated.

Citations and references
Citations

References
 

1786 ships
Whaling ships
Maritime incidents in 1806
Maritime incidents in 1824
Age of Sail merchant ships
Merchant ships of the United Kingdom